Salahley District is a District of the Maroodi Jeex Region in Somaliland. Its capital lies at Salahlay.

The Salahlay District was established during the presidency of Muhammad Haji Ibrahim Egal.

In September 2022, water with traces of crude oil was collected while drilling a well in Bahadhamal.

Townships
Some of The Major cities and towns

 Salahley, Capital of the District
 Hundulli
 Toon
 Uubaale
 Maygaagaha
 Sharmarke
 Dhimberyaale
 Xadhigxadhig
 Bali Ciise
 Bali Mataan
 Xaabaalle
 Raybadka
 Bahadhamal
 Qoolcaday
 Aadan Abokor
 Ina Guuxaa
 Laanqayrta Celiyo
 Raybadka

See also
Administrative divisions of Somaliland
Regions of Somaliland
Districts of Somaliland

References

Districts of Somaliland
Maroodi Jeex